Arctia allardi is a moth in the family Erebidae. It was described by Charles Oberthür in 1911. It is found in China (Sichuan, Qinghai, and eastern Tibet).

The species of the genus Preparctia , including this one, were moved to Arctia as a result of phylogenetic research published by Rönkä et al. in 2016.

Subspecies
Arctia allardi allardi
Arctia allardi tibetica Dubatolov, Kishida & C.S. Wu, 2005 (China: Tibet)

References

Moths described in 1911
Arctiini